Nellayi railway station (station code: NYI) falls between the Irinjalakuda railway station and the Pudukad railway station. It lies in the busy Shoranur–Cochin Harbour section of Trivandrum division. Nellayi railway station is operated by the Chennai-headquartered Southern Railways of the Indian Railways.

References

Thiruvananthapuram railway division
Railway stations in Thrissur district